The 23rd Metro Manila Film Festival was held in 1997.

MaQ Productions' Nasaan ang Puso won the most awards at the festival with ten, including Best Picture, Best Actress for Maricel Soriano, Best Actor for Christopher de Leon and the Gatpuno Antonio J. Villegas Cultural Awards among others. Viva Films and Neo Films' Magic Kingdom followed with six awards including the Best Float and the Third Best Picture Award. Meanwhile, the Second Best Picture, Gem's Babae got four awards. The festival also showcases the first Filipino full-length animated film Adarna: The Mythical Bird.

Entries

Winners and nominees

Awards
Winners are listed first and highlighted in boldface.

Multiple awards

References

External links

Metro Manila Film Festival
MMFF
MMFF